"Hooked on You" is a song written and composed by David Gates, and originally recorded by the soft rock group Bread, of which Gates was the leader and primary music producer. It was the second single released from Bread's 1976 album Lost Without Your Love, and became their final charting hit.

The song reached No. 60 on the U.S. Billboard Hot 100 during the spring of 1977. In Canada, it reached No. 48.  "Hooked on You" was a much bigger Adult Contemporary hit, spending two weeks at number one on the Canadian Adult Contemporary chart and three weeks at number two in the United States, where it was held off the top spot by Yvonne Elliman's "Hello Stranger".

Chart performance

References

External links
 Lyrics of this song 
 

1976 songs
1977 singles
Bread (band) songs
Songs written by David Gates
Elektra Records singles